Ptah, the El Daoud, recorded and released in 1970, is the third solo album by Alice Coltrane. The album was recorded in the basement of her house in Dix Hills on Long Island, New York.

This was Coltrane's first album with horns (aside from one track on A Monastic Trio (1968), on which Pharoah Sanders played bass clarinet). Sanders is recorded on the right channel and Joe Henderson on the left channel throughout. Coltrane noted: "Joe Henderson is more on the intellectual side, while Pharoah is more abstract, more transcendental."

All the compositions were written by Alice Coltrane. The title track is named for an Egyptian god, Ptah, "the El Daoud" meaning "the beloved". "Turiya", according to the liner notes, "was defined by Coltrane as "a state of consciousness — the high state of Nirvana, the goal of human life", while "Ramakrishna" was a 19th-century Bengali religious figure and also denotes a movement founded by his disciples. On "Blue Nile", Coltrane switches from piano to harp, and Sanders and Henderson from tenor saxophones to alto flutes.

The album's cover design was by Jim Evans.

Reception

In a review for AllMusic, Stacia Proefrock called Ptah, the El Daoud "a truly great album", writing: "listeners who surrender themselves to it emerge on the other side of its 46 minutes transformed. From the purifying catharsis of the first moments of the title track to the last moments of 'Mantra,' with its disjointed piano dance and passionate ribbons of tenor cast out into the universe, the album resonates with beauty, clarity, and emotion... Overlooked and buried for years in obscurity, this album deserves to be embraced for the gem it is." Mark Richardson, writing for Pitchfork, commented: "Coltrane is tremendously versatile on this record, at some points hunkering down in gauzy mysticism while elsewhere concentrating on logical, disciplined soloing. Echoes of her grounding in post-bop jazz are still present, though less so than on her 1968 debut A Monastic Trio. The eight-minute 'Turiya and Ramakrishna' runs the gamut and contains some of her greatest piano playing on record, as she moves from the tough blues of the main theme to a soaring, impressionistic, and, yes, harp-like flurry of notes that seem to hang suspended in space."

At the JazzIz web site, Matt Micucci included the album in his list "Five Essential Albums of 1970", calling it "the culmination of her 'first period,' marked by music reminiscent of her collaborations with her late husband John and her explorations of the concert harp as an improvising vehicle." Morgan Enos, in an article for the Grammy web site, called the album "otherworldly yet drenched in the blues", and stated that it "contains abundant hypnotic power and emotional import". The article contains tributes from a number of musicians, including ESP-Disk manager and producer Steve Holtje, who noted: "I have a certain fondness of placing this album in the lineage of DIY recording... It's a Black female artist taking control of her music", and Melvin Gibbs, who commented: "It's homey. It has that Sunday-afternoon-after-church vibe... it feels like your relatives were playing for you. That's evocative for me". Regarding the fact that the album was recorded during a period of grief following the death of John Coltrane, pianist Cat Toren noted: "She had four young kids, and she had lost the love of her life. I think that's huge. It speaks to her power as a woman, to go forth no matter the adversity of what else is going on in her life. I would be interested to know her support network and how she was able to produce this incredible work under such challenging conditions."

The authors of the Penguin Guide to Jazz Recordings wrote: "Ptah is the highest avatar of God in Egyptian religion, and the title-piece is a rippling essay in transcendence, the paired horns coming from quite different directions... Their doubling on alto flute on 'Blue Nile' is magnificent, a perfect complement to piano and harp." They called "Turiya and Ramakrishna" "a huge meditation that is the triple-distilled spirit of lightness."

Track listing
"Ptah, the El Daoud" – 13:58
"Turiya and Ramakrishna" – 8:19
"Blue Nile" – 6:58
"Mantra" – 16:33
All tracks composed by Alice Coltrane, and recorded at the Coltrane home studio in Dix Hills, New York on 26 January 1970.

Personnel
Alice Coltrane — harp (on track 3), piano
Pharoah Sanders — tenor sax (on tracks 1 & 4, right channel), alto flute (on track 3),  bells
Joe Henderson — tenor sax (on tracks 1 & 4, left channel), alto flute (on track 3)
Ron Carter — bass
Ben Riley — drums

References

External links
  Ptah, the El Daoud — Alice Coltrane website album page

1970 albums
Alice Coltrane albums
Impulse! Records albums